Maja Tokarska (born 22 February 1991) is a Polish volleyball player, a member of the national team and Polish club Legionovia Legionowo.

Internationally she was the bronze medalist of European League and silver medalist of European Games, as well as winning multiple domestic club honours in Poland and Japan.

Career

She took part in 1st edition of European Games. On June 27, 2015 Poland was beaten by Turkey and Tokarska with her team mates achieved silver medal.

Sporting achievements

Clubs
 2012  Polish League Championship  – Champion, with Trefl Sopot
 2012  Polish Cup – Runner-up, with Trefl Sopot
 2013  Polish League Championship  – Runner-up, with MKS Dąbrowa Górnicza
 2013  Polish Cup – Champion, with MKS Dąbrowa Górnicza
 2015  Polish League Championship  – Runner-up, with Trefl Sopot
 2015  Polish League Championship – Champion, with Trefl Sopot
 2015  CEV Cup – Runner-up, with Trefl Sopot
 2016  Polish League Championship  – Runner-up, with Trefl Sopot
 2016  Polish Cup – Runner-up, with Trefl Sopot
 2017  Japanese League Championship  – Runner-up, with Hisamitsu Springs
 2017  Japanese Cup – Runner-up, with Hisamitsu Springs
 2019  Polish League Championship  – podium finish, with Trefl Sopot
 2022  Polish Cup - Champion with Legionovia Legionowo

National team
 2014  European League
 2015  European Games

References

External links
 ORLEN Liga player profile

1991 births
Living people
Sportspeople from Gdańsk
Polish women's volleyball players
Polish expatriates in Japan
Volleyball players at the 2015 European Games
European Games medalists in volleyball
European Games silver medalists for Poland
21st-century Polish women